Sara El Bekri (born 2 July 1987) is a Moroccan swimmer who competes in the women's 400m individual medley.

At the 2008 Summer Olympics, she competed in the women's 100 and 200 m breaststroke, but did not qualify for either final.  At the 2012 Summer Olympics she finished 32nd overall in the heats in the Women's 400 metre individual medley and failed to reach the final.  She also competed in the 100 and 200 metre breaststroke without reaching those finals.

References

Moroccan female swimmers

Living people
Olympic swimmers of Morocco
Swimmers at the 2008 Summer Olympics
Swimmers at the 2012 Summer Olympics
Female medley swimmers
Sportspeople from Casablanca
1987 births
20th-century Moroccan women
21st-century Moroccan women